Behrouz Nikbin (born in Iran) is an Iranian (Persian) immunologist and biomedical scientist. Nikbin studied medicine at Tehran University and got a PhD degree in immunology.

External links
Behrouz Nikbin's publications in pubmed

Iranian immunologists
Living people
Year of birth missing (living people)
University of Tehran alumni